Iron Man 2 is a soundtrack album for the 2010 film of the same name consisting of music by Australian hard rock band AC/DC. It was released on April 19, 2010.

Iron Man 2: Original Motion Picture Score, a separate film score album featuring music composed by John Debney, was released on July 20, 2010.

Iron Man 2

Background and release
The album of AC/DC songs was announced on January 26, 2010, and released on April 19 in the United Kingdom, the next day in the United States, and on April 23 in Australia. It consists of fifteen tracks originally released on ten different albums between 1975 and 2008, with the music drawn almost equally from the Bon Scott and Brian Johnson eras of AC/DC. Some of the material was remixed by Mike Fraser for possible inclusion in the film, but, of the songs included on the album, only "Shoot to Thrill" and "Highway to Hell" were ultimately featured in the film, while "Thunderstruck", "War Machine", and "The Razors Edge" were used in trailers and commercials; "Back in Black" had been featured in Iron Man (2008).

Like the soundtrack album for Stephen King's 1986 film Maximum Overdrive, which is titled Who Made Who and also exclusively features music by AC/DC, Iron Man 2 has been seen as, not a greatest hits collection, but a compilation album that contains both hits and lesser known tracks. Unlike Who Made Who, however, there are no new songs on Iron Man 2. Of the use of the band's music in the film, Steve Barnett, co-chairman of Columbia Records, said: "Jon Favreau's vision and passion for AC/DC's music blend seamlessly into this incredible film. The music really underscores the high energy and excitement of the film."

Music videos
A new music video for "Shoot to Thrill" was released on January 26, 2010. It features exclusive footage from the film Iron Man 2, as well as live concert footage of AC/DC performing the song in River Plate Stadium in Buenos Aires in late 2009. The concert footage was later featured in the concert film Live at River Plate (2011).

Upon the album's release, a music video for "Highway to Hell" was released. It features footage from the film Iron Man 2 alongside footage and live audio of AC/DC performing the song in River Plate Stadium in late 2009.

Reception and chart performance

Stephen Thomas Erlewine of the online music database AllMusic gave the album a mixed review, writing that "this is good guts-and-guitar music, its only flaw being that it plays it totally safe…unless you stop to consider that it might be a bit of a risk to pitch a collection of 30-year-old music to the teenage audience of Iron Man 2." The BBC gave the album a positive review, stating: "Younger listeners might find it all a bit clichéd, but remember: AC/DC are the originators, their imitators responsible for diluting the package’s potency. For those about to rock, raise another salute to your enduringly enthralling forefathers."

The album debuted at No. 1 on the UK Albums Chart upon its release, giving AC/DC their third No. 1 album in the U.K. after Back in Black (1980) and Black Ice (2008). In the U.S., it sold 76,000 copies in its first week of release and debuted at No. 4 on the Billboard 200, becoming the band's eighth top-10 release on the chart. It reached the top of the Billboard Mainstream Rock Albums chart and stayed there for five consecutive weeks.

Track listing

Personnel
Angus Young – lead guitar
Malcolm Young – rhythm guitar, backing vocals
Brian Johnson – lead vocals (tracks 1, 3, 5, 6, 8, 11, 12, 14)
Bon Scott – lead vocals (tracks 2, 4, 7, 9, 10, 13, 15)
Cliff Williams – bass guitar, backing vocals (tracks 1–3, 5–8, 11, 12, 14, 15)
Mark Evans – bass guitar (tracks 4, 9, 10, 13)
Phil Rudd – drums (tracks 1–5, 7–11, 13–15)
Chris Slade – drums (tracks 6, 12)

Charts

Weekly charts

Year-end charts

Certifications

Iron Man 2: Original Motion Picture Score

Background
All of the songs on the film score soundtrack were composed by John Debney, except for "Make Way for Tomorrow Today", which was used for the Stark Expo in the film. It was composed by Richard M. Sherman as an homage to "There's a Great Big Beautiful Tomorrow", a song he and his brother Robert wrote for a Disney attraction at the 1964 New York World's Fair.

Reception

James Christopher Monger from Allmusic wrote that Debney "had to contend with a near constant barrage of classic AC/DC songs when putting together his score". He called "I Am Iron Man" "a rousing, heroic, old-fashioned blast of all American guts and glory that sounds ripped (in a good way) from an old A-Team episode", and continued that "Antagonist Ivan Vanko's theme is appropriately muscular and Russian sounding, while action cues are beefy and peppered with bursts of distorted guitar (presumably a nod to Angus Young's omnipresent riffage), resulting in a score that’s more than worthy of its narcissistic, heavily armored protagonist."

Track listing
Tracks 5 and 25 composed by Richard M. Sherman; all other tracks composed by John Debney

Additional music
Music featured in the film, but not included in either soundtrack album:

"Should I Stay or Should I Go" by The Clash – plays when Tony Stark starts up his workshop computers
"The Magnificent Seven" by The Clash – plays while Tony and Happy are sparring
"California Love" by 2Pac, Dr. Dre & Roger Troutman – plays briefly during Tony's birthday party
"Another One Bites the Dust" by Queen – plays during the fight between Stark and Lt. Col. James Rhodes
"It Takes Two" by Rob Base and DJ E-Z Rock – plays during the fight between Stark and Rhodes
"Robot Rock" by Daft Punk – plays during the fight between Stark and Rhodes
"Pick Up the Pieces" by Average White Band – plays while Justin Hammer makes his stage entrance
"Groove Holmes" by The Beastie Boys – plays when Stark is sitting in the "Randy's Donuts" sign
 A medley of the following American patriotic songs can be heard during Justin Hammer's presentation: "The Caissons Go Rolling Along", "Anchors Aweigh", "The U.S. Air Force", and "In The Halls of Montezuma"

Notes

References

External links
 Soundtracks for Iron Man 2 at Internet Movie Database

2010 compilation albums
2010 soundtrack albums
2010s film soundtrack albums
AC/DC compilation albums
AC/DC soundtracks
Columbia Records compilation albums
Columbia Records soundtracks
Iron Man (film series)
Marvel Cinematic Universe: Phase One soundtracks
John Debney soundtracks